James R. Kincaid is an American academic, currently the Aerol Arnold Professor of English at the University of Southern California. His Erotic Innocence (1998) discusses the sexualization of children in mainstream culture. 

Kincaid received the Raubenheimer Award for Teaching and Scholarship in 2000.

Works

Dickens and the Rhetoric of Laughter 1972
Tennyson's Major Poems 1975
Novels of Anthony Trollope 1977
Child-Loving: The Erotic Child and Victorian Culture 1992
Annoying the Victorians 1994
My Secret Life 1996
Erotic Innocence: The culture of child molesting 1998
Lost 2012
The Daily Charles Dickens, A Year of Quotes, University of Chicago Press, 2018

External links
 Victorian Web page

References

Living people
American Jews
American non-fiction writers
American literary critics
Literary critics of English
University of Southern California faculty
American academics of English literature
Year of birth missing (living people)